Badger is a city in Webster County, Iowa, United States. The population was 522 at the 2020 census. The town got its name from Badger Creek, which itself got its name when a group of soldiers from Fort Dodge in the early 1850s saw a badger for the first time.

Geography
Badger is located at  (42.615303, -94.144454).

Demographics

2010 census
As of the census of 2010, there were 561 people, 215 households, and 163 families living in the city. The racial makeup of the city was 97.7% White, 0.4% African American, 0.2% Native American, 0.2% Asian, and 1.6% from two or more races. Hispanic or Latino of any race were 1.2% of the population.

There were 215 households, of which 37.2% had children under the age of 18 living with them, 63.3% were married couples living together, 7.4% had a female householder with no husband present, 5.1% had a male householder with no wife present, and 24.2% were non-families. 20.9% of all households were made up of individuals, and 8.4% had someone living alone who was 65 years of age or older. The average household size was 2.61 and the average family size was 3.03.

The median age in the city was 38.7 years. 26.9% of residents were under the age of 18; 8.1% were between the ages of 18 and 24; 26.4% were from 25 to 44; 26% were from 45 to 64; and 12.7% were 65 years of age or older. The gender makeup of the city was 49.4% male and 50.6% female.

2000 census
As of the census of 2000, there were 610 people, 227 households, and 172 families living in the city. The racial makeup of the city was 99.67% White, and 0.33% from two or more races. Hispanic or Latino of any race were 0.49% of the population.

There were 227 households, out of which 41.4% had children under the age of 18 living with them, 64.3% were married couples living together, 8.4% had a female householder with no husband present, and 24.2% were non-families. 19.8% of all households were made up of individuals, and 11.9% had someone living alone who was 65 years of age or older. The average household size was 2.69 and the average family size was 3.10.

30.0% were under the age of 18, 7.7% from 18 to 24, 27.9% from 25 to 44, 21.6% from 45 to 64, and 12.8% were 65 years of age or older. The median age was 33 years. For every 100 females, there were 100.0 males. For every 100 females age 18 and over, there were 95.9 males.

The median income for a household in the city was $41,250, and the median income for a family was $46,250. Males had a median income of $35,000 versus $21,458 for females. The per capita income for the city was $15,573. About 6.1% of families and 7.8% of the population were below the poverty line, including 11.2% of those under age 18 and 6.3% of those age 65 or over.

Education
Badger is within the Fort Dodge Community School District. Badger residents are zoned to Cooper Elementary School. The district's sole secondary schools are Fort Dodge Middle School and Fort Dodge Senior High School.

In 2018 the district opted to assign Badger to Cooper during its elementary school boundary adjustments.

References

Cities in Iowa
Cities in Webster County, Iowa